NGC 130 is an unbarred lenticular galaxy. It was discovered on November 4, 1850 by Bindon Stoney, the very same day he discovered NGC 126 and NGC 127. This galaxy belongs in the NGC 128 group of galaxies.

References

External links 
 

0130
Pisces (constellation)
Astronomical objects discovered in 1850
Unbarred lenticular galaxies